The president of the Senate of the Republic of the Congo is the presiding officer of the upper chamber of the legislature of Republic of the Congo.

This is a list of presidents of the Senate of the Republic of the Congo, which was established in 1992:

Footnote and references

Politics of the Republic of the Congo
Republic of the Congo, Senate
 
1992 establishments in the Republic of the Congo